U.S. Catholic may refer to:

 Catholic Church in the United States
 U.S. Catholic, a publication of the Claretians